Albert R. Hall (April 20, 1841June 2, 1905) was an American farmer, businessman, and Republican politician.  He served seven terms in the Minnesota House of Representatives, representing Hennepin County, and was speaker from 1872 until 1874.  He later moved to Dunn County, Wisconsin, and served six terms in the Wisconsin State Assembly (1891–1903).  In historical documents, his name is sometimes abbreviated as A. R. Hall.

Early life
Albert R. Hall was born in Hartford, Vermont, in 1841.  At age four, his parents moved the family to Boston, Massachusetts.  Hall attended Boston's public schools until 1856, when the family moved to the Minnesota Territory.

Civil War service
At the outbreak of the American Civil War, Hall volunteered for service with the Union Army and was enrolled as a private in Company D, 2nd Minnesota Infantry Regiment.  With this regiment, he served in the Army of the Cumberland in the western theater of the war and was promoted to corporal and then first sergeant.  In the campaign for control of Middle Tennessee, he participated in the battles of Mill Springs, Perryville, Hoover's Gap, and Chickamauga.  At Chickamauga, he was shot in the torso and left for dead on the battlefield.  He survived and was captured, but was paroled after just ten days of captivity.  He returned to his regiment near Resaca, Georgia, where he joined the Atlanta campaign.  During this campaign, his three-year enlistment expired and he returned to Minnesota.  He assisted in recruiting new volunteers for the 11th Minnesota Infantry Regiment and was commissioned as 1st lieutenant for Company G of the regiment.  He returned to the field with the new regiment in the Fall of 1864 and was appointed provost marshal at Gallatin, Tennessee, where he remained until the end of the war.

Postbellum career

Back in Minnesota, he served as a town clerk and justice of the peace and was elected to the Minnesota House of Representatives for seven terms.

He moved to the village of Knapp in Dunn County, Wisconsin, in 1880, where he resided for the rest of his life.  In Wisconsin, he formed a business partnership named Hall & Dann for the manufacturing of staves.  Their business continued until they exhausted their supply of timber.

He was elected chairman of the town board and was president of the Dunn County Agricultural Society. He was a member of the commission for the construction of the Dunn County Asylum and later served as a trustee of the asylum.  He was elected to represent Dunn County in the Wisconsin State Assembly for six terms, retiring in 1903.

He died at his home in Knapp on June 2, 1905, after a brief illness.  His doctors diagnosed the cause of death as acute Bright's disease.  His funeral was well-attended, and included Governor Robert La Follette and other prominent state officials.  His body was then taken by train to Minneapolis and buried with his family at Lakewood Cemetery.

References

1841 births
1905 deaths
Speakers of the Minnesota House of Representatives
Republican Party members of the Minnesota House of Representatives
Republican Party members of the Wisconsin State Assembly
People from Hartford, Vermont
People from Dunn County, Wisconsin
19th-century American politicians